Franz Sagmeister (born 21 October 1974) is a German bobsledder who competed from 1997 to 2005. He won a bronze medal in the two-man event at the 2003 FIBT World Championships in Lake Placid, New York.

Competing in two Winter Olympics, Sagmeister earned his best finish of sixth in the two-man event at Salt Lake City in 2002.

Sagmeister retired at the end of 2005, but attempted to come back with the German national team for the 2007-08 season with René Spies without success.

References

 2002 bobsleigh two-man results
 2002 bobsleigh four-man results
 Bobsleigh two-man world championship medalists since 1931
 FIBT profile
 Official website 

1974 births
Bobsledders at the 2002 Winter Olympics
Bobsledders at the 2006 Winter Olympics
German male bobsledders
Living people
Olympic bobsledders of Germany